The 3rd Massachusetts Battery (or, 3rd Battery, Massachusetts Light Artillery), was an artillery battery that served in the Union Army during the American Civil War.

Service
The battery was organized Boston, Massachusetts and mustered in September 5, 1861 for a three-year enlistment under the command of Captain Augustus Pearl Martin.

The battery was attached to Porter's Division, Army of the Potomac, to March 1862. Artillery, 1st Division, III Corps, Army of the Potomac, to May 1862. Artillery, 1st Division, V Corps, Army of the Potomac, to June 1863. Artillery Brigade, V Corps, to September 1864.

The 3rd Massachusetts Battery mustered out of service September 16, 1864.

Detailed service
Moved to Washington, D. C., September 5–11. At Hall's Hill, Va., defenses of Washington, until March 1862. Advanced on Manassas, Va., March 10–15. Moved to Fort Monroe March 21–24. Reconnaissance to Big Bethel March 27. Warwick Road April 5. Siege of Yorktown April 5-May 4. Hanover Court House May 27. Operations about Hanover Court House May 27–29. Seven Days Battles before Richmond June 25-July 1. Battle of Beaver Dam Creek June 26. Battle of Gaines's Mill June 27. Battle of White Oak Swamp and Turkey Bridge June 30. Battle of Malvern Hill July 1. At Harrison's Landing until August 15. Moved to Fort Monroe, then to Manassas, Va., August 15–28. Pope's campaign in northern Virginia August 28-September 2. Groveton August 29. Second Battle of Bull Run August 30. Maryland Campaign September–October. Battle of Antietam September 16–17. Shepherdstown September 19. At Sharpsburg until October 30. Reconnaissance to Leetown October 16–17. Leetown October 17. Movement to White Plains and Falmouth, Va., October 30-November 19. Battle of Fredericksburg December 11–15, "Mud March" January 20–24, 1863. Duty at Falmouth until April. Chancellorsville Campaign April 27-May 6. Battle of Chancellorsville May 1–5. Gettysburg Campaign June 13-July 24. Battle of Gettysburg July 1–3. Bristoe Campaign October 9–22. Rappahannock Station November 7. Mine Run Campaign November 26-December 2. Camp near Rappahannock Station December 4, 1863 to May 1, 1864. Campaign from the Rapidan to the James May–June. Battle of the Wilderness May 5–7. Spotsylvania May 8–12. Spotsylvania Court House May 12–21. Bloody Angle May 12. North Anna River May 23–26. Line of the Pamunkey May 26–28. Totopotomoy May 28–31. Cold Harbor June 1–12. Bethesda Church June 1–3. Before Petersburg June 16–19. Siege of Petersburg June 16-September 5. Six Mile House, Weldon Railroad, August 18–21. Left the front September 4. Veterans and recruits transferred to the 5th Massachusetts Battery August 30. Moved to Boston September 5–9.

Casualties
The battery lost a total of 19 men during service; 9 enlisted men killed or mortally wounded, 10 enlisted men died of disease.

Commanders
 Captain Augustus Pearl Martin
 1st Lieutenant Aaron Francis Walcott - commanded at the Battle of Gettysburg

Notes

Bibliography

See also

 List of Massachusetts Civil War units
 Massachusetts in the Civil War
 3rd Massachusetts Battery monument at Gettysburg Battlefield

Military units and formations established in 1861
Military units and formations disestablished in 1864
Units and formations of the Union Army from Massachusetts
M